William Noel Morris (born September 29, 1932), known as Bill Morris, is a Tennessee politician who served as mayor of Shelby County, Tennessee, including the city of Memphis. He also was a sheriff of the Shelby County Sheriff's Office.  He was the president of the Tennessee County Services Association, an organization of county officials.

Morris served as the sheriff of Shelby County from 1964 to 1970.  During his tenure as sheriff, Morris was in charge of the custody of assassin James Earl Ray.  Ray admitted while in custody to the 1968 murder of civil rights leader Martin Luther King Jr.  However, Ray later claimed he was coerced into pleading guilty.

Morris was Mayor of Shelby County from 1978 to 1994.  Morris was instrumental, along with park superintendent Tom Hill, in introducing a herd of bison to Shelby Farms.

In 1994, Morris campaigned for the Democratic nomination for Governor of Tennessee, placing second in the race to Phil Bredesen.

Tennessee State Route 385 in Shelby County, which was originally known as Nonconnah Parkway, was renamed as Bill Morris Parkway.

References

Living people
Heads of county government in Tennessee
Politicians from Memphis, Tennessee
Tennessee sheriffs
1930s births